Playa Grande is a resort town and western suburb of the city of Piriápolis in the Maldonado Department of Uruguay.

Geography
The resort is located on Route 10 and borders the city to the southeast, with a small creek as the natural border, while to the northwest it borders the resort Playa Hermosa.

Population
In 2011 Playa Grande had a population of 1,031 permanent inhabitants and 1,476 dwellings.
 
Source: Instituto Nacional de Estadística de Uruguay

References

External links
INE map of Las Flores, Playa Verde, Playa Hermosa and Playa Grande

Populated places in the Maldonado Department
Beaches of Uruguay
Seaside resorts in Uruguay
Piriápolis